This is a list of Albanians in Egypt that includes both Egyptian people of Albanian descent and Albanian immigrants that have resided in Egypt. The list is sorted by the fields or occupations in which the notable individual has maintained the most influence.

For inclusion in this list, each individual must have a Wikipedia article and show that they are Albanian and have lived in Egypt.

Monarchs and Sultans 

Muhammad Ali of Egypt  –   Ottoman Albanian commander in the Ottoman army, who rose to the rank of Pasha, and became Wāli, and self-declared Khedive of Egypt and Sudan 
Ibrahim Pasha of Egypt  –  Eldest son of Muhammad Ali, the Wāli and unrecognised Khedive of Egypt and Sudan
Abbas I of Egypt  –  Wāli of Egypt and Sudan
Sa'id of Egypt –   Wāli of Egypt and Sudan from 1854 until 1863
Isma'il Pasha –  Khedive of Egypt and Sudan from 1863 to 1879
Tewfik Pasha –  Khedive of Egypt and the Sudan between 1879 and 1892 and the sixth ruler from the Muhammad Ali Dynasty
Hussein Kamel of Egypt –  Sultan of Egypt from 19 December 1914 to 9 October 1917
Fuad I of Egypt –  Sultan and later King of Egypt and Sudan
Abbas Helmi II of Egypt –  Khedive of Egypt and Sudan
Hussein Kamel of Egypt –  Sultan of Egypt
Mohammed Ali Tewfik –   Heir presumptive of Egypt and Sudan from 1892 to 1899 and 1936 to 1952

Kings 
Farouk of Egypt –  Tenth ruler of Egypt from the Muhammad Ali dynasty and the penultimate King of Egypt and the Sudan
Fuad II of Egypt –  Member of the Egyptian Muhammad Ali dynasty

Prime Ministers 
Said Halim Pasha –   Ottoman statesman of Tosk origin who served as Grand Vizier of the Ottoman Empire from 1913 to 1917

Princes of Egypt 
Prince Kamal el Dine Hussein –  The son of Sultan Hussein Kamel of Egypt
Mohamed Abdel Moneim –  Egyptian prince and former heir apparent to the throne of Egypt and Sudan from 1899 to 1914
Muhammad Ali, Prince of the Sa'id –   Heir apparent to the abolished thrones of Egypt and Sudan
Prince Omar Toussoun –  Member of the Muhammad Ali Dynasty of Egypt.
Ahmad Rifaat Pasha –  Member of the Muhammad Ali Dynasty of Egypt. He was heir presumptive to Sa'id Pasha
Hassan Aziz Hassan –  Egyptian prince

Princesses of Egypt 
Fawzia Fuad of Egypt –   Egyptian-Albanian princess who became Queen of Iran
Princess Farial of Egypt –  Eldest child of Egypt's penultimate monarch, King Farouk
Faika of Egypt –   Egyptian royal and a member of the Mohammad Ali Dynasty
Princess Fawzia Farouk of Egypt –  Second daughter of King Farouk I of Egypt from his first wife Queen Farida
Princess Fadia of Egypt –  Daughter of the late King Farouk of Egypt
Faiza Rauf –  Egyptian princess and a member of the Muhammad Ali Dynasty
Princess Fawzia-Latifa of Egypt –  Egyptian princess and daughter of Fuad II
Fathia Ghali –  Youngest daughter of Fuad I of Egypt and Nazli Sabri, and so the youngest sister of Farouk I
Emina Ilhamy –  Egyptian and Ottoman princess and a member of the Muhammad Ali Dynasty
Zeynab Ilhamy –  Egyptian and Ottoman princess
Tevhide Ilhamy –  Egyptian and Ottoman princess
Shivakiar Ibrahim –  Egyptian princess and a member of the Muhammad Ali Dynasty
Shahnaz Pahlavi –  First child of the Shah of Iran, Mohammad Reza Pahlavi, and his first wife, Princess Fawzia of Egypt
Ayn-al-Hayat Rifaat –  Egyptian princess and a member of the Muhammad Ali Dynasty
Shafaq Nur Hanim –  Princess consort of Khedive Isma'il Pasha

Politicians 
Aziz Ezzat Pasha –   Egyptian Politician
Adel Darwish –   British political journalist, a veteran Fleet Street reporter, author, historian

Military 
Abidin Bey  –  Albanian commander and politician of Egypt
Tusun Pasha  –  Son of Muhammad Ali, wali of Egypt between 1805 and 1849
Tahir Pasha  –  Albanian commander of bashi-bazouks under Koca Hüsrev Mehmed Pasha
Ibrahim Ilhamy Pasha  –  Only surviving son of Abbas I of Egypt
Ismail Chirine  –  He served as commander in chief of the Egyptian army
Ahmad Ismail Ali  –  Egypt's army and minister of war during the October War of 1973

Finance, Business 
Prince Abbas Hilmi  –  Egyptian and Imperial Ottoman prince and financial manager. In 2006, he founded the Friends of Manial Palace Museum Association, which seeks to preserve the palace of his granduncle Prince Muhammad Ali.

Musicians 
Tefta Tashko-Koço  –  Well-known Albanian singer of the 1930s

Media 
Filip Shiroka - Albanian poet and writer who lived and worked in Egypt for a while. 
Ismail Joubert  –  South African and Egyptian poet and writer.

References 

 
Lists of Albanian people